Ancylolomia hamatella is a moth in the family Crambidae. It was described by Wang and Sung in 1981. It is found in China (Yunnan).

References

Ancylolomia
Moths described in 1981
Moths of Asia